Sheila E. Harsdorf (born July 25, 1956) is a Republican politician in Wisconsin, most recently serving as Wisconsin Secretary of Agriculture, Trade, and Consumer Protection. Harsdorf previously served in the Wisconsin Senate and the Wisconsin State Assembly.

Early life, education and career
Harsdorf was born in Stillwater, Minnesota, in 1956 and her family moved to River Falls, Wisconsin, in 1970. Harsdorf graduated from the University of Minnesota in 1978 with a B.S. in Animal Science, and returned to River Falls to become a loan officer for the Production Credit Association while farming part-time on the Harsdorf family dairy farm. Two years later, she and her older brother, Jim, became partners in the family business.

While farming full-time, Harsdorf was a member of the Pierce County Farm Bureau Board of Directors from 1982 to 1988, serving as treasurer for three years. She also served as chair of the Pierce County Dairy Promotion Committee in 1986. She was a member of the Board of Directors of the Pierce-Pepin Holstein Breeders Association, was a graduate of the Wisconsin Rural Leadership Program, and was involved in Pierce County 4-H as a member of the Dairy Committee and a coach of the Dairy Judging Team.

Wisconsin legislature

State Assembly
In 1988, Harsdorf ran for and won the seat of the 30th Assembly District in the Wisconsin State Assembly. She won a total of five consecutive elections, finishing her last term in 1999.

During Harsdorf’s time in the State Assembly, she served on the Assembly committees on Natural Resources, on Veterans and Military Affairs, and on Agriculture, and was the ranking Republican on the Colleges and Universities Committee. She also served on the Legislative Advisory Committee on the Minnesota-Wisconsin Boundary Area Commission and on the Legislative Council Special Committee on Land Use. In 1995, she was appointed to the prestigious Joint Finance Committee, a 16-member committee responsible for drafting the state’s biennial budget.

State Senate
In 2000, Harsdorf entered the 10th State Senate District race against Democratic Senator Alice Clausing, a two-term incumbent. The 10th Senate District comprises all of St. Croix County and portions of Burnett, Dunn, Pierce and Polk counties in the northwestern part of the state.  She defeated Clausing and independent candidate Jim Nelson in the general election. She was re-elected in 2004, defeating challenger Gary Bakke, and 2008, defeating challenger Alison Page.

Harsdorf served as chair of the Senate Committee on State and Federal Relations and Information Technology and vice chair of the Committee on Agriculture, Forestry, and Higher Education. She also served as co-chair of the Joint Committee on Information Policy and Technology, and as a member of the Joint Committee on Finance. She previously served as chair of the Higher Education and Tourism Committee, as the ranking Republican on the Agriculture and Higher Education Committee, and as a member of the Commerce, Utilities, Energy and Rail Committee and the Joint Legislative Council. She was also a member of the Mississippi River Parkway Commission.

Recall effort

Harsdorf was subject to a recall effort as part of the 2011 Wisconsin protests. Recall organizers filed an estimated 23,000 signatures with the Wisconsin Government Accountability Board, which verified the petitions and overruled challenges by Harsdorf. The recall election was set for August 9, 2011. Teacher and educators' union official Shelly Moore ran against Harsdorf in the recall election. Harsdorf defeated Moore, 58 percent to 42 percent in the recall election.

Cabinet appointment
In November 2017, Harsdorf was appointed Wisconsin Secretary of Agriculture, Trade and Consumer Protection by Governor Scott Walker.  Her brother, Jim, had previously served in the same role under Governor Scott McCallum from 2001 to 2003. Harsdorf is the first woman to head DATCP in the department’s 88-year history.

Personal life
In her hometown of River Falls, Harsdorf is a member of Luther Memorial Church. Harsdorf is a past member of the Kinnickinnic River Land Trust Board and the Wisconsin Conservation Corps Board. She is also a former president of the Wisconsin FFA Foundation Sponsor’s Board.

Electoral history

Source: Wisconsin Bluebook

References

External links
 Biography at Wisconsin Department of Agriculture, Trade, and Consumer Protection
 Biography at Ballotpedia
 Financial information (state office) at the National Institute for Money in State Politics
 10th Senate District, Senator Harsdorf in the Wisconsin Blue Book (2005–2006)

1956 births
Living people
University of Minnesota College of Food, Agricultural and Natural Resource Sciences alumni
People from River Falls, Wisconsin
Republican Party Wisconsin state senators
Republican Party members of the Wisconsin State Assembly
Women state legislators in Wisconsin
State cabinet secretaries of Wisconsin
21st-century American politicians
21st-century American women politicians